jblas is a linear algebra library, created by Mikio Braun, for the Java programming language built upon BLAS and LAPACK.  Unlike most other Java linear algebra libraries, jblas is designed to be used with native code through the Java Native Interface (JNI) and comes with precompiled binaries.  When used on one of the targeted architectures, it will automatically select the correct binary to use and load it.  This allows it to be used out of the box and avoid a potentially tedious compilation process.  jblas provides an easier to use high level API on top of the archaic API provided by BLAS and LAPACK, removing much of the tediousness.

Since its initial release, jblas has been gaining popularity in scientific computing.  With applications in a range of applications, such as text classification, network analysis, and stationary subspace analysis.  It is part of software packages, such as JLabGroovy, and Universal Java Matrix Library (UJMP). In a performance study of Java matrix libraries, jblas was the highest performing library, when libraries with native code are considered.

Capabilities 

The following is an overview of jblas's capabilities, as listed on the project's website:

 Eigen – eigendecomposition
 Solve – solving linear equations
 Singular – singular value decomposition
 Decompose – LU, Cholesky, ...
 Geometry – centering, normalizing, ...

Usage example 

Example of Eigenvalue Decomposition:
DoubleMatrix[] evd = Eigen.symmetricEigenvectors(matA);
DoubleMatrix V = evd[0];
DoubleMatrix D = evd[1];

Example of matrix multiplication:
DoubleMatrix result = matA.mmul(matB);

See also

 NumPy
 SciPy
 ND4J: NDArrays & Scientific Computing for Java

References 

Java (programming language) libraries